Phil Mishkin (died 1995) was a state legislator in Florida. A Democrat, he represented Pasco County in the Florida House of Representatives. He advocated for universal healthcare. He and his wife moved to Florida from New Jersey.

Mishkin won an upset victory in the 1990 election defeating Republican House leader John Renke. He was 75. He served two terms in the Florida House.

References

Democratic Party members of the Florida House of Representatives
Machinists
Year of birth missing
1995 deaths